Mamo Clark (December 6, 1914 – December 18, 1986), sometimes billed as Mamo, was an American actress and author.

Early life
Mamo Clark was born on December 6, 1914 in Honolulu, Hawaii. On July 1, 1933, Clark sailed to the mainland United States on the SS Malolo with her stepmother, May Kaaolani Clark, and father, Joseph Kealakaimana Clark. Her stepmother was the daughter of John Adams Cummins. Her biological mother was Evelina Mahoe. Both her mother and stepmother were descendants of 15th-century Hawaiian chief Liloa and distant relatives of Kamehameha I.

Film career 
She made her film debut in a featured role in Mutiny on the Bounty (1935) as Miamiti, Fletcher Christian's (Clark Gable) wife in the film. The following year she appeared in the serial Robinson Crusoe of Clipper Island as a Polynesian princess. In 1937, she appeared with Mutiny on the Bounty co-star Movita in The Hurricane. Clark played roles in several 'B-pictures with Pacific Island settings, for instance Hawaii Calls (1938).

One Million B.C. (1940) provided her with a substantial role as the "Queen of the Rock Tribe" appearing with Lon Chaney Jr. The same year she appeared in the film The Girl From God's Country. She retired from films after a minor role in the Marlene Dietrich and John Wayne film Seven Sinners (1940).

Personal life 
Clark married U.S. Army Captain James Rawley and had a son, James Rawley Jr. After marriage, she retired from show business and went back to school, earning a degree from UCLA in 1965. 

Clark died of cancer on December 18, 1986 aged 72 in Panorama City, California, U.S. .

Filmography

References

External links

 

1914 births
1986 deaths
Native Hawaiian people
American film actresses
Deaths from cancer in California
Actresses from Honolulu
Writers from Honolulu
20th-century American actresses